V830 Tauri is a T Tauri star located  away from the Sun in the constellation Taurus. This star is very young, with an age of only 2 million years, compared to the Sun's age, which is 4.6 billion years. Typical for a young stars, it exhibits a strong flare activity, with three flared detected in 91-days observation period in 2016.

Characteristics 
V830 Tauri is an M-type star. The star has a mass of roughly 1 solar mass, but has a radius of 2 solar radii, due to the star's age, which means that it hasn't fully contracted yet to become a main-sequence star.

V830 Tauri is a T Tauri star, a pre-main sequence star that has a surrounding disc producing emission lines in its spectrum. It is classified as a weak-lined T Tauri star. It is also classified as a BY Draconis variable, cool stars with starspots and chromospheric activity that vary in brightness as they rotate. The variable period of 2.74 days matches the rotation period.

V830 Tauri is a T Tauri star that is the same mass of the Sun, but twice the radius. It has a surface temperature of 4250 ± 50 K. In comparison, the Sun has a surface temperature of 5778 K. The star's age is estimated to be about 2 million years old, which makes it a very young star. For comparison, the Sun is 4.6 billion years old. The star has not yet fully contracted to become a main sequence star, which ties in with its bloated radius but similar mass to the Sun. Given its mass, it will likely be on the main sequence portion of its lifetime for about 10 billion years, much like the Sun.

Planetary system 

On June 20, 2016, an exoplanet was found around V830 Tauri via radial velocity. It is one of, if not the youngest exoplanet ever found, with an age of only about 2 million years. However, a 2020 study was unable to confirm this planet.

V830 Tauri b orbits its parent star every 4.93 days at a distance of 0.057 AU from its parent star. This is about 7x closer to the host star than the planet Mercury is to the Sun. Its mass is about 70% that of Jupiter, and, because it is orbiting very close to its parent star, it is classified as a hot Jupiter.

Previously, before the discovery of V830 Tauri b (and a slightly older planet named K2-33b, with an age around 5-10 million years), TW Hya b was discovered and disproven and PTFO 8-8695 b / CVSO 30 b was discovered with an age equally young and an orbit even closer. The yet unconfirmed objects are pending confirmation. The discovery of V830 Tauri b, K2-33b and PTFO 8-8695 b / CVSO 30 b suggests that the formation and migration of close-in giant planets can occur on a timescale of only a few million years. The new discoveries support planet-disc interactions as the most likely mechanism for efficiently producing young hot Jupiters.

Notes

References 

Taurus (constellation)
Pre-main-sequence stars
BY Draconis variables
T Tauri stars
J04331003+2433433
IRAS catalogue objects
M-type stars
Hypothetical planetary systems
Tauri, V830